The 1990 Campionati Internazionali di San Marino was a men's tennis tournament played on outdoor clay courts at Centro Sportivo Serravalle in San Marino and was part of the World Series of the 1990 ATP Tour. It was the third edition of the tournament and the second as an ATP Tour event, and was held from 20 August until 26 August 1990. First-seeded Guillermo Pérez Roldán won the singles title.

Finals

Singles
 Guillermo Pérez Roldán defeated  Omar Camporese 6–3, 6–3
 It was Pérez Roldán's 1st title of the year and the 6th of his career.

Doubles
 Vojtěch Flégl /  Daniel Vacek defeated  Jordi Burillo /  Marcos Górriz 6–1, 4–6, 7–6

References

External links
 ITF tournament edition details

Campionati Internazionali di San Marino
San Marino CEPU Open
1990 in Sammarinese sport